Jewargi Assembly seat is one of 224 assembly constituencies in Karnataka State, in India. It is part of Gulbarga (Lok Sabha constituency).

Assembly members

Hyderabad State (Andole Jewargi Constituency)
 1951: Sharangouda Sidramayya, Independent

Mysore State
 1957: Sharangouda Sidramayya, Independent
 1962: Nilkanthappa Sharnappa Bhoj Raj, Indian National Congress
 1967: S. Siddramgouda, Swatantra Party
 1972: Dharam Singh, Indian National Congress

Karnataka State
 1978:	Dharam Singh, Indian National Congress (Indira)
 1983:	Dharam Singh, Indian National Congress
 1985:	Dharam Singh, Indian National Congress
 1989:	Dharam Singh, Indian National Congress
 1994:	Dharam Singh, Indian National Congress
 1999:	Dharam Singh, Indian National Congress
 2004:	Dharam Singh, Indian National Congress
 2008:	Doddappagouda Shivalingappagoud Patil Naribol, Bharatiya Janata Party
 2013:	Ajay Singh, Indian National Congress
 2018: Ajay Singh, Indian National Congress

See also
List of constituencies of the Karnataka Legislative Assembly

References

Assembly constituencies of Karnataka
Kalaburagi district